Moody Woman is the thirty-seventh album by American country music artist Charley Pride. It was released in February 1989 via 16th Avenue Records. The album includes the single "Amy's Eyes".

Track listing

Chart performance

References

1989 albums
Charley Pride albums
16th Avenue Records albums